The 2012–13 A-League was the 36th season of top-flight soccer in Australia, and the eighth season of the Australian A-League since its establishment in 2004. The 2012–13 season saw the introduction of a new Western Sydney-based team, the return of Newcastle Jets FC after their A-League licence was returned by FFA, and the end of Gold Coast United after they were removed from the competition at the end of the previous season. This season was also the last A-League season to be broadcast exclusively on paid television, after SBS obtained the rights to a live Friday night game each week of the A-League season, and all A-League finals games on a one-hour delay, on a $160 million four-year broadcast deal, effective from the 2013–14 A-League season onwards.

Clubs

Personnel and kit specifications

Transfers

Managerial changes

Foreign players

The following do not fill a Visa position:
1Those players who were born and started their professional career abroad but have since gained Australian Residency (and New Zealand Residency, in the case of Wellington Phoenix);
2Australian residents (and New Zealand residents, in the case of Wellington Phoenix) who have chosen to represent another national team;
3Injury Replacement Players, or National Team Replacement Players;
4Guest Players (eligible to play a maximum of ten games) 
5Additional Expansion Club Visa Player

Salary cap exemptions and captains

Regular season

League table

Home and away season
The 2012–13 season sees each team play 27 games, kicking off on 5 October 2012, and concluding on 31 March 2013.

Week 1

Week 2

Week 3

Week 4

Week 5

Week 6

Week 7

Week 8

Week 9

Week 10

Week 11

Week 12

Week 13

Week 14

Week 15

Week 16

Week 17

Week 18

Week 19

Week 20

Week 21

Week 22

Week 23

Week 24

Week 25

Week 26

Week 27

Table of results

Finals series
In its eighth season the A-League has adopted a new knock-out format for the finals with six teams competing over a three-week series climaxing in the decider. As a result, the play-offs have been reduced from four to three weeks and the top two teams no longer receive a double chance. Instead they will get the opening week of the final series off and will only need to win one game to make the grand final.

Elimination Finals

Semi-finals

Grand Final

Season statistics

Top scorers

Own goals

Attendances
These are the attendance records of each of the teams at the end of the home and away season. The table does not include finals series attendances.

Updated to 3 February 2013

Top 10 Season Attendances

Discipline
The Fair Play Award will go to the team with the lowest points on the fair play ladder at the conclusion of the home and away season.

Current as of 5 January 2013
Notes

 Brisbane Roar's Thomas Broich was given a straight red card that was later rescinded by the Match Review Panel.

Awards

End-of-season awards
Johnny Warren Medal –  Marco Rojas, Melbourne Victory
NAB Young Footballer of the Year –  Marco Rojas, Melbourne Victory
Nike Golden Boot Award –  Daniel McBreen, Central Coast Mariners, 17 Goals
Goalkeeper of the Year –  Ante Covic, Western Sydney Wanderers
Manager of the Year –  Tony Popovic, Western Sydney Wanderers
Fair Play Award – Brisbane Roar
Referee of the Year –  Peter Green
Goal of the Year –  Marcos Flores, Melbourne Victory (Melbourne Victory v Wellington Phoenix, 05-Nov-12)

Team of the season
Formation: 4–3–3

See also

 2012–13 Adelaide United FC season
 2012–13 Brisbane Roar FC season
 2012–13 Central Coast Mariners FC season
 2012–13 Melbourne Heart FC season
 2012–13 Melbourne Victory FC season
 2012–13 Newcastle Jets FC season
 2012–13 Perth Glory FC season
 2012–13 Sydney FC season
 2012–13 Wellington Phoenix FC season
 2012–13 Western Sydney Wanderers FC season

Notes

References

 
A-League Men seasons
A League
A League
A League